Koipady  is a census town in Kasaragod district in the state of Kerala, India. Koipady is a part of Kumbla grama panchayat.

Demographics
As of 2011 India census, Koipady census town had a population of 20,418 with 10,077 males (49.4%) and 10,341 females (50.6%). Total number of households was 3,960 in the town limits. Population of children in the age group of 0-6 was 2,345 (11.5%) which includes 1,204 boys (51.3%) and 1,141 girls(48.7%). 

Total number of literates in Koipady town was 16,191 which makes overall literacy of 89.6%. Male literacy stands at 93.5% and Female literacy at 85.8%.

References

Suburbs of Kasaragod